Jean-Baptiste Brondel (23 February 1842 – 3 November 1903) was a Belgian-born prelate of the Catholic Church. He served as bishop of the Diocese of Vancouver Island in British Columbia and Alaska (1879–1883) and as vicar apostolic and bishop of the Diocese of Helena in Montana (1884–1903).

Biography

Early life 
Jean-Baptiste Brondel was born in Bruges to Charles Joseph and Isabella (née Becquet) Brondel. One of seven children, he was the youngest of his parents' five sons; his eldest brother and one of his sisters also pursued religious careers. He received his early education from the Xaverian Brothers in his native city. In 1852, Brondel entered the College of St. Louis in Bruges, where he studied for ten years. Inspired by the works of Father Pierre-Jean De Smet, he decided to become a missionary in North America. He then studied philosophy and theology at the American College of Louvain in Leuven, Belgium.

Priesthood 
Brondel was ordained to the priesthood by Cardinal Engelbert Sterckx on 17 December 1864. At age 24, he was below the age requirement for ordination but was granted a dispensation by Pope Pius IX. He continued his studies at the American College for two more years

Brondel arrived at Vancouver, British Columbia in 1866. He taught at Holy Angels College in Vancouver for one year, then moved to the Washington Territory in the United States.  He served as rector of the church at Steilacoom with its attendant missions for ten years. During his tenure there, he also built churches in Tacoma and Olympia, both in Washington. Brondel was transferred to Walla Walla in 1877, but returned to Steilacoom the following year.

Bishop of Vancouver Island 
On 26 September 1879, Brondel was appointed the third bishop of the Diocese of Vancouver Island by Pope Leo XIII. He received his episcopal consecration on 14 December 1879 from Archbishop Charles J. Seghers. The diocese included Vancouver Island,  a British territory, as well as Alaska, an American territory.

Vicar apostolic of Montana 
On 7 April 1883, Leo XIII named Brondel as vicar apostolic of Montana.

Bishop of Helena 
The vicariate was elevated to the Diocese of Helena on 7 March 1884 by Leo XIII, with Brondel becoming its first bishop.

During his tenure, Brondel traveled throughout the state, establishing several new parishes and building churches. He also significantly increased the number of priests; by 1903, the number of seminarians in Montana increased from one to thirteen. He took a particular interest in the evangelization of Native Americans, and the United States government often used his popularity among that community to further its aims in the community. 

Jean-Baptiste Brondel died at Helena at age 61, and was buried in a vault under the cathedral of that city.

References

External links
 (years shown on the marker are as Bishop of Helena)

1842 births
1903 deaths
Clergy from Bruges
Roman Catholic bishops of Helena
19th-century Belgian Roman Catholic priests
19th-century Roman Catholic bishops in Canada
20th-century Roman Catholic bishops in the United States
Belgian emigrants to the United States
Burials in Montana
KU Leuven alumni
American College of the Immaculate Conception alumni
Roman Catholic Archdiocese of Seattle
People from Steilacoom, Washington
20th-century Roman Catholic bishops in Canada
Roman Catholic bishops of Victoria in Canada
19th-century American Roman Catholic priests